The Mayor of Galle is the head of Galle Municipal Council and his office is located at the Galle Town Hall.

List of mayors

The following were the Mayor of Galle:

References

External links 
Methsiri de silva website 

 
Galle